Staryi Krym is an urban-type settlement in Mariupol Raion of Donetsk Oblast, Ukraine.

References

Urban-type settlements in Mariupol Raion
Mariupol Raion